Athos was a patrol vessel that was originally built for the French Navy. The pair of patrol vessels, Athos and Aramis, were sponsored by the commune of Auch in Gers until 2012. The commune of Saint-Martin-Sainte-Catherine in Creuse, has been the sponsor since 23 February 2013. Athos was transferred to the Maritime Gendarmerie at the beginning of 2016. The only French Navy vessel to be entirely made of beech wood, her hull was capable of withstanding M5 model 4 style torpedoes.

History
The two boats were ordered for the support of the Centre d'Essais des Landes (C.E.L.). They joined the star division of the Adour, created on 14 March 1980, date of the admission to active service of Athos.

Service 
The two boats were installed at the Bayonne naval base. This division, dissolved in 1993, took the name of Site Surveillance Patroller (PSS) in 1995. Their main mission is the surveillance of the shooting range, the positioning of the targets and their recovery and the support to the divers of the Center of Test of Missile Launch (CELM). Their secondary mission consists of maritime surveillance of the Bay of Biscay for the fisheries police, assistance operations and pollution control.

Athos joined the port of Cherbourg-Octeville in 2016. She supervises the Channel and the North Sea along with Aramis, while being assigned to the Maritime Gendarmerie.

This was part of a chain of events sparked by a new fishing licence scheme, unilaterally introduced by the Jersey authorities in alleged contravention of an agreement between the UK and the EU nations containing conditions that had not been discussed with the French authorities. Athos was decommissioned, together with her sister boat Aramis, on 8 December 2022. Both vessels were replaced by new Maroni-class patrol boats.

References

Patrol vessels of the French Navy
Patrol vessels of France
1979 ships
Ships built in France